Palaiokastro ("old castle") is a castle built in the eastern part of the Aegean island of Ios, 17 km from Chora. Today, the ruins left are parts of the walls and ruins of its internal buildings. Inside the walls there is now the small Church of Panagia Paleokastritsa.

The castle was built in 1397 by the Duke of Naxos, Francesco I Crispo, based on an older Byzantine castle that existed in the area. The structure lies on the top of a hill at an altitude of 275 m.

References

Buildings and structures completed in 1397
Ruined castles in Greece
Crusader castles in Greece
Ios
Buildings and structures in the South Aegean
Duchy of the Archipelago
Venetian archaeological sites in Greece